Suru (also Romanized as Sūrū; also known as Sorow) is a village in Howmeh Rural District, in the Central District of Deyr County, Bushehr Province, Iran. At the 2006 census, its population was 83, in 20 families.

References 

Populated places in Deyr County